Muladi massacres were a series of massacres of unarmed Hindu and Christian men and elderly women in the river port of Muladi in East Pakistan between 17 and 20 February 1950 by armed mobs with the active connivance of the Ansars and the police.

Events 
As the news of killings in Dhaka reached Barisal district, tension began to mount. On 14 February a peace meeting was held at the Jinnah Club where the Muslim leaders assured the Hindus and Christians of protection. In spite of the assurances Kazirchar and Khaserhat were attacked on 15 February. On the night of 16th the village of Satani was attacked and set on fire. Madan Nandi, a well-to-do Hindu and his brother were killed. Two eminent doctors, Dr. Prafulla C. Gain and Dr. Kallol B. Banerjee were victims too. When the villagers went to lodge a complaint at the Muladi police station the Officer in Charge asked the villagers to cremate the dead and tell their family that they had died of disease. The insensitive and nonchalant attitude of the O.C. scared the villagers.

17 February 

From the night of 16th, cries of 'Allah ho Akbar' and 'Kill the infidels' could be heard from a distance. On the morning of 17th, terrified Hindus and Christians began to rush towards the Muladi police station. The O.C. however refused to provide any shelter to the terrified people. At around 3 P.M., a 3,000 to 4,000 strong mob attacked and looted the warehouses in the Muladi port. The Hindus/Christians ran helter-skelter and the armed mob pounced upon them. They killed the men indiscriminately and violated the women in broad daylight in public.  The orgy of loot, murder, rape and arson continued till the evening, when they departed with the loot and the abducted women. Christian churches were vandalized and looted. The streets, ghats and the river were full of corpses. In the betelnut orchard of one Hindu, more 300 dead bodies were found.

18 February 
On the morning of 18th, Saturday, many Hindus and Christians returned to their looted, destroyed and gutted houses. In the evening, they once again assembled at the police station. This time they were allowed inside in lieu of their cash and jewellery. In the meantime, the Ansars went all around Muladi announcing in loudspeakers asking the Hindus to assemble at the Muladi police station. After the Hindus and Christians had gathered hundreds of non-Muslim men were massacred within the precincts of the police station. The O.C. himself stripped the Hindu women of their vermillion and conch shell bangles and forced them to recite the kalma. Later he distributed the women among the gang leaders.

20 February 
The survivors of Muladi and adjoining villages had spent the last couple of nights under the sky, in jungles and burnt houses. On the morning of 20 February, the Officer in Charge announced that a relief camp has been opened in the port area. He seized all the money and the jewellery from the Hindus gathered at the police station and directed them towards the port. At the port the Hindus were divided into three groups at put up at three warehouses - the Panch Tahabil and the ones belonging to Madhablal Kundu and Sukhamay Kundu.

At around 12 noon, at the signal of the O.C. a 3,000 strong armed Muslim mob attacked the warehouses. More than 700 men and elderly women were massacred and their bodies thrown into the river. The remaining women were taken into a shed belonging to one Mukteshwar Saha and forced to recite the kalma. After that 50 women were distributed among the gang leaders.

In the afternoon, Sirajul Haque, the Regional Controller of Procurement arrived from Barisal in a launch accompanied by armed police. The goondas fled. The surviving men and unabducted women were taken to Barisal.

List of people killed 
 Pranballabh Ghosh
 Ganga Charan Sarkar (62)
 Nityananda Pal (65)
 Makhanlal Kundu
 Sukhamay Kundu
 Radhashyam Kundu
 Bipin Kundu
 Nagen Kundu
 Haren Kundu
 Mahendranath Gain
 Dr. Prafulla Gain
 Parambrata Gain
 Barada Kanta Pal
 Gopal Pal
 Sukhada Sundari Pal
 Dhiren Pal
 Kabiraj D. N. Ray
 Madan Pal
 Gopal Kundu
 Kayek Kundu
 Mahesh Chandra Pal (117)
 Madan Nandi
 Lalu Nandi
 Narayan Bhaduri
 Jashoda Lal Kundu
 Dr. Kumud Bihari Banerjee

References 

Massacres in Pakistan
Mass murder in 1950
1950 in East Pakistan
Massacres of Bengali Hindus in East Pakistan
Persecution of Hindus
Persecution by Muslims
Government of Liaquat Ali Khan
Barishal District
February 1950 events in Asia
Massacres in 1950